Intocable ("Untouchable" in English) is an American band from  Zapata, Texas that plays Regional Mexican music; specializing in Norteño and Tejano music. It was started by friends Ricardo Javier Muñoz and René Orlando Martínez in the early 1990s.  In a few years, Intocable fused the genres Tejano and Norteño with a musical signature that fused Tejano's robust conjunto and Norteño folk rhythms with a pop balladry. Intocable is perhaps the most influential group in Tejano and their tough Tejano/Norteño fusion has become the blueprint for several Tejano bands. The group's style combines romantic, hooky melodies, tight instrumentation and vocal harmony.

Career
Career accomplishments include four consecutive sold-out nights at Mexico City's prestigious Auditorio Nacional and the group's 2003 headlining appearance at Reliant Stadium in Houston, which drew a record 70,104 fans. They also play every year as tradition with two sold-out dates (lately three) at the 10,000-capacity Monterrey Arena in Monterrey, Mexico —an unusual accomplishment given that Norteño groups typically play large dance halls and rarely arenas unless it is an all day festival event. Intocable has also won at least eight of Univision's Premio Lo Nuestro awards. They received their first Grammy win in February 2005 at the 47th Annual Grammys (Grammy Award for Best Mexican/Mexican-American Album; Intimamente) and second at the 53rd annual Grammys for their album Classic.

They were the first of their genre to play at Dallas Cowboys Stadium, at the halftime show of the 2011 Dallas Cowboys vs. Washington Redskins game, and also at The Greek Theatre in Los Angeles. They garnered two of the 5 nominations to the Billboard Regional Mexican Awards and got a nod for Best Norteño Album to the 2011 Latin Grammy for their album INTOCABLE 2011. They were also nominated for a Grammy for the album.  INTOCABLE 2011 was released under the group's own music label Good-i Music and the first two singles, Robarte Un Beso and Prometí, went to Number 1 on US regional radio charts.  The 3rd single Arrepientete also did very well on radio and their 4th single Llueve was premiered live onstage at the 2012 Premio lo Nuestro where the group swept with all three categories they were nominated for.

On October 12, 2015, Intocable made history by streaming a showcase for the whole world, in which more than 22,000 people tuned in. 100% of the proceeds were donated to St. Jude Hospital to help children affected with cancer; there the inception of #AyudaAAyudar was formed and will continue to do events to raise funds for this noble cause.

On January 23, 2016, Intocable announced their partnership with St. Jude, a pledge first of its kind in the music industry. Today, their support not only creates awareness for the cause, but their pledge of support contributes to assure that families pay for nothing and can focus on letting their children live.

Intocable headlined SXSW 2016 SXAmericas All Latino Showcase, making Intocable the first Latino act to headline this three-day series of charity beneficiary concert events. The group took over the largest SXSW stage, which attracted more than 50,000 attendees over the three-day period.

In the early 1990s, the band's first indie albums barely sold. In February 1994 their album Fuego Eterno, with new label EMI Latin, had notable sales. The music of Ramón Ayala influenced the direction of the band. The band's lead vocalist and accordion player, Ricky Muñoz has stated that Ayala is his biggest inspiration. In 1997, the band suffered a setback when two members of the band left to form their own group—Johnny Lee Rosas, (bajo sexto and 2nd voice), and Albert Ramirez, (bass), formed Grupo Masizzo. Rosas rejoined the group in 2003 after four successful solo albums. In July 2017, Intocable performed their first ever concert in Toronto, Ontario, Canada.

On June 11, 2020, Intocable came back out on tour since the pandemic shut down almost everything. They hosted their first Drive-In show in Poteet, Texas

June 30, 2020, it was announced by Lead Singer Ricky Muñoz that 5 members tested positive for COVID-19.

Road accident
On January 31, 1999, two band members, José Ángel Farias and Silvestre Rodríguez, along with road manager José Ángel González were tragically killed in an accident while driving to Monterrey, Nuevo León, Mexico's General Mariano Escobedo International Airport to catch a flight to Mexico City. The group's van blew a tire, causing the vehicle to roll off Mexican Federal Highway 40 and crash. After rolling over, Ricky Muñoz was the only one left in the van due to him wearing his seat belt on while the other members were laying on the side of the highway. Muñoz and the remaining members of the group suffered multiple injuries and spent weeks in a Monterrey hospital. After a six-month layoff, Intocable toured successfully behind the comeback album Contigo (With You), whose first single was entitled "El Amigo Que Se Fue" (The Friend That Has Left), a tribute song to the fallen band members.

Latin hits
Intocable gained 20 Latin top 10 hits. The following are some of Intocable's songs that reached the top ten on Billboard Latin singles charts:
Caminare, Te Perdono, Llueve, Eso Duele, Eres Mi Droga, Amor Maldito, Soñador Eterno, Perdedor, El Amigo Que Se Fue, Ya Estoy Cansado, Enséñame A Olvidarte, Déjame Amarte, Contra Viento y Marea, Y Todo Para Qué? and other songs.

Band members

Current members
Ricardo Muñoz – (Lead Vocalist, Accordion) (1993–Present)
René Orlando Martinez– (Drums, Chorus) (1993–Present)
Sergio Serna – (Percussion)(1993–Present)
Johnny Lee Rosas – (Bajo Sexto, Backup Vocalist)(1994-1997) (2003–2016)(2017-Present)
Alejandro Gulmar - (Bajo Sexto)(2013–Present)
Felix Salinas - (Bass)(1995)(1999-2015) (2016-Present)n

Former members
José Juan Hernández - (Group Motivator, Rhythms)(1999-2020)
Albert Ramírez - (Bass)(1995-1997) (2015)
Daniel "Danny" Sanchez – (Bajo Sexto, Second Voice)(1997-2007)(2009-2012)(2016–2017)
José Ángel Farías – (Group Motivator, Rhythms) (Deceased) (1995-1999)
Silvestre Rodríguez – (Bass) (Deceased) (1997-1999)
José Ángel González – (Road Manager) (Deceased)
Juan J. González Jr. – (Bajo Sexto, Guitar) 1993
Ricardo J. Garcia - (Drums, Second Voice) (2016-2018)
Ismael Arreola Jr. – (Group Motivator, Rhythms) 1993
Juan J. Serna – (Bass) 1993–1995
Adalberto Mejía – (Bass)
Jose "Pepe" Perez – (Bass)
Jason Rodriguez - (Bass)

Timeline

Discography 
Simplemente...Intocable (Simply...Untouchable) (1993)
Fuego Eterno (Eternal Fire) (1994)
Otro Mundo (Another World) (1995)
Llévame Contigo (Take Me With You) (1996)
IV (4) (1997)
Intocable (Untouchable) (1998)
Contigo (With You) (1999)
Es Para Tí (It's For You) (2000)
Sueños (Dreams) (2002)
The History (2003)
Nuestro Destino Estaba Escrito (Our Destiny Was Written) (2003)
Intimamente (Intimately/Live album) (2004)
X (10) (2005)
Crossroads: Cruce de Caminos (2006) (2007-Fan Edition)
2C (12) (2008)
Classic ("Clasico" Mexico) (2009)
Super #1's (2010)
INTOCABLE 2011 (2011)
En Peligro de Extinción (In Danger Of Extinction) (2013)
XX (20) Aniversario (20th Anniversary) (2015)
Highway (Highway) (2016)
Percepción (Perception) (2019)
Desde Casa en Concierto y Canciones Desempolvadas (From Home in Concert and Dusted Songs) (2020)
Texican (Texican) (2020)

Awards 
Grammy Award for Best Mexican/Mexican-American Album (2005)

Latin Grammy Award for Best Norteño Album (2005, 2013)

Grammy Award for Best Norteño Album (2011)

Billboard Latin Music Lifetime Achievement Award (2012)

Nominations 
ALMA Award for Outstanding Latin Group of the Year (2002)

American Music Award for Favorite Latin Artist (2004)

Latin Grammy Award for Album of the Year (2005)

Latin Grammy Award for Best Short Form Music Video (2006)

Grammy Award for Best Banda or Norteño Album (2012)

Grammy Award for Best Regional Mexican Music Album (2014)

References

External links

 
 Official YouTube
 Intocable to release 12th anniversary album
 Intocable interview with Acceso Total
 
 

 01
American norteño musicians
Musical groups from Texas
Norteño music groups
Tejano music groups
Grammy Award winners
Latin Grammy Award winners
American Latin musical groups
Spanish-language singers of the United States
EMI Televisa Music artists
Universal Music Latin Entertainment artists